Sukhothai Football Club is a Thai professional association football club based in Sukhothai province. They play in the Thai League 1. Sukhothai FC represents the Sukhothai Province mainly known for being the first Kingdom of Thailand. Their main team colors are red and white and their away colors are black and green. Sukhothai FC play all their home matches at the Thalay Luang Stadium which has a maximum capacity of 9,500.

History

Early history

Sukhothai FC was established in 2009 and entered the Regional League Northern Division. They finished their first ever season in the Regional League Northern Division in 7th place out of 11 teams. In 2014, after 6 years in the third tier division, Sukhothai got the promotion to 2015 Thai Division 1 League.

In 2015, the newly promotion team Sukhothai had a successful campaign in Thai Division 1 League with the finishing in the unexpected third place of the final standing. Sukhothai has promoted to 2016 Thai League.

In 2019, Sukhothai academy's top prospect, Jasraj Sangha, was offered a contract with the first team, but declined the offer, later stating that it was a "late notice".

Top League
In 2016, the first year in the top league, Sukhothai created the overachieved run by finishing in the seventh place of the table. Sukhothai also qualified for 2017 AFC Champions League after being one of co-winner of FA Cup.

Main rivalry
Sukhothai's main neighboring rivals are with Phitsanulok and Kamphaengphet.

Stadium and locations

Season by season record

Continental record

Players

Current squad

Out on loan

Coaches

 Chusak Sriphum 
 Somchai Makmool 
 Somchai Chuayboonchum 
 Somchai Makmool 
 Pairoj Borwonwatanadilok 
 Yannawit Khantharat 
 Chalermwoot Sa-ngapol 
 Ljubomir Ristovski 
 Pairoj Borwonwatanadilok  
 Surapong Kongthep 
 Dennis Amato

Honours

Domestic leagues
Regional League Northern Division
 Winner (1) : 2014
FA Cup
Champions: 2016

References

External links
 Official website of Sukhothai FC
 Official fanpage of Sukhothai FC
 Official livescore of Sukhothai FC

 
Thai League 1 clubs
2009 establishments in Thailand
Association football clubs established in 2009
Football clubs in Thailand
Sport in Sukhothai province